Baiduri Bank, established in 1994, is a member of the Baiduri Bank Group in Brunei. The Baiduri Bank Group comprises Baiduri Bank and two wholly owned subsidiaries, Baiduri Finance and Baiduri Capital. The Bank's shareholders are Baiduri Holdings and Darussalam Assets.

Subsidiaries 

Baiduri Finance, founded in 1996, is a wholly owned subsidiary of Baiduri Bank. Baiduri Finance is also the only finance company in Brunei to achieve full end-to-end compliance to ISO standards covering all functions and processes throughout the organisation when it achieved ISO9001:2015 Certification in Quality Management Systems. Baiduri Capital is a wholly owned subsidiary of Baiduri Bank and was established in 2015. Baiduri Capital is the first to offer online Securities Trading in Brunei Darussalam.

Awards and accolades 
In 2019 alone, the Baiduri Bank Group received four international banking awards from leading publications such as World Finance, Global Finance, Asian Banking & Finance and The Banker. World Finance awarded the Baiduri Bank Group as the "Best Banking Group for Brunei", the "Domestic Retail Bank of the Year for Brunei" from the Asian Banking & Finance Magazine, the "Best Bank in Asia-Pacific Region for Brunei" from Global Finance magazine, as well as the coveted "Bank of the Year for Brunei" from The Banker magazine.

References

External links

 Official Website

Banks of Brunei
Banks established in 1994
1994 establishments in Brunei